Aye Zindagi (Life finds a way) is a 2022 Indian drama film, based on a true story, written and directed by debutant Anirban Bose. Produced by Shiladitya Bora, the film stars the 3-time National Award-Winning Actor Revathy, Satyajeet Dubey (of ‘Mumbai Diaries 26/11’ fame), Mrinmayee Godbole (of 'Chi Va Chi Sau Ka' and 'CRD' fame), Sawan Tank, Hemant Kher and Shrikant Verma in major roles. ‘Aye Zindagi’ is set to release in theatres in India and North America on 14 October 2022.

Plot 
Based on an incredible true story, Aye Zindagi follows the journey of a 26-year-old liver cirrhosis patient Vinay Chawla whose unlikely bond with a hospital grief counsellor Revathi, rekindles his hope and faith in life and makes him believe in the power of humanity.

Cast 

 Revathy as Revathi Rajan
 Satyajeet Dubey as Vinay Chawla
 Mrinmayee Godbole as Manjula Nair
 Sawan Tank as Kartik Chawla
 Hemant Kher as Dr. Kapoor
 Shrikant Verma as Mr. Sharma
 Muskaan Agarwal as Arundhati Rajan
 Pranjal Trivedi as Nandan Rajan
 Mandeep Kumar as Mr. Pathak

Production 
Aye Zindagi is Shiladitya Bora’s second Hindi production under his banner Platoon One Films. The shooting for the film was completed in 27 days, starting in September 2021. The film was shot in a semi-functional hospital in Navi Mumbai and multiple locations in Mumbai and Pune. The film is in theatres now in India and North America.

Reception 
Aye Zindagi has garnered multiple reviews since its theatrical release in India and North America on 14 October 2022.

In his review, Dhaval Roy from Times of India called the film a "bittersweet saga will tug at your heartstrings. A must watch". Times of India gave Aye Zindagi a 4-star rating.

Acclaimed film critic Komal Nahta states in his review, "It’s a small film, this ‘Aye Zindagi'. But it has a huge impact on the viewers." Komal also goes on to praise the technical departments of the film in his review.

In his review, Devesh Sharma from Filmfare writes that Aye Zindagi, "Carries a powerful, affirmative message that really is the need of the hour."

Sonil Dedhia from the News18 network congratulates the team in his review - "A triumph for its cast, crew and for us, the audience... Aye Zindagi is a heartfelt experience which terrifies and touches...".

Navbharat Times' review states that Aye Zindagi is, "A sensitively written and directed film, rich in emotion... All the actors give splendid performances."

References

External links 

 

2022 films
Indian drama films